Incident in a Small Town is a 1994 American made-for-television drama film directed by Delbert Mann, and starring Walter Matthau, Harry Morgan and Stephanie Zimbalist. This is the third and final film featuring the characters Harmon Cobb and Judge Bell, following The Incident (1990) and Against Her Will: An Incident in Baltimore (1992).  Cobb and Bell are played by Matthau and Morgan in all three films.

Plot
The film is set in Baltimore in 1953. Harmon Cobb comes to the defense of Judge Bell, who stands accused of killing the abusive father of his estranged daughter's child.

Cast
 Walter Matthau as Harmon Cobb
 Harry Morgan as Judge Bell
 Stephanie Zimbalist as Lily Margaret Bell
 Nick Stahl as John Bell Trenton
 Bernard Behrens as Judge Greeves
 Lori Hallier as Madeleine
 David Nerman as Frank Trenton
 Dennis Strong as Joseph Baldwin
 James Blendick as Seawright
 Dee McCafferty as Police Officer
 Cara Pifko as Nancy
 Eve Crawford as Mrs. Deane
 Jim Warren as Chuck
 Jeremy Tracz as Travis
 Bruce McFee as Spencer

References

External links
 
 
 

1994 television films
1994 films
1994 drama films
American courtroom films
Television sequel films
Films directed by Delbert Mann
Films scored by Lee Holdridge
CBS network films
Films set in Illinois
Films set in 1953
Television courtroom dramas
American drama television films
1990s English-language films
1990s American films